Duriankari, or Duriankere, is a possibly extinct Papuan language (or dialect) of Indonesian Papua. It is associated with the village of Duriankari at the southern tip of the island of Salawati, which is part of the Raja Ampat Archipelago and is adjacent to the Bird's Head Peninsula of the West Papuan mainland.

It was observed in the 1950s that its speakers were shifting to the Moi language. Duriankari was reported in the 1980s to have had about 100 speakers, but by the 1990s it was said to be extinct. The Inanwatan language is spoken in a few villages over 150 kilometres to the east (as well as by a smaller community across the Sele Strait from Duriankari in the village of Seget). The Inanwatan people there regard the Duriankari as descendants of Inanwatans who were carried away so far west by a mythical flood.

References

Bibliography 

Inanwatan–Duriankere languages